Phosphonium iodide is a chemical compound with the formula . It is an example of a salt containing an unsubstituted phosphonium cation. Phosphonium iodide is commonly used as storage for phosphine and as a reagent for substituting phosphorus into organic molecules.

Preparation
Phosphonium iodide is prepared by mixing diphosphorus tetraiodide with elemental phosphorus and water at 80 °C and allowing the salt to sublime.

Properties

Structure
Its crystal structure has the tetragonal space group P4/nmm, which is a distorted version of the NH4Cl crystal structure; the unit cell has approximate dimensions 634×634×462 pm. The hydrogen bonding in the system causes the  cations to orient such that the hydrogen atoms point toward the  anions.

Chemical
At 62 °C and atmospheric pressure, phosphonium iodide sublimates and dissociates reversibly into phosphine and hydrogen iodide (HI). It oxidizes slowly in air to give iodine and phosphorus oxides; it is hygroscopic and is hydrolyzed into phosphine and HI:

Phosphine gas may be devolved from phosphonium iodide by mixing an aqueous solution with potassium hydroxide:

It reacts with elemental iodine and bromine in a nonpolar solution to give phosphorus halides; for example:

Phosphonium iodide is a powerful substitution reagent in organic chemistry; for example, it can convert a pyrilium into a phosphinine via substitution. In 1951, Glenn Halstead Brown found that PH4I reacts with acetyl chloride to produce an unknown phosphine derivative, possibly .

References

Inorganic phosphorus compounds
Phosphonium compounds
Iodides
Reagents for organic chemistry